Festival da Canção ("Song Festival") or Festival RTP da Canção is the name given to the national festival produced and broadcast by Rádio e Televisão de Portugal (RTP) to select the  for the Eurovision Song Contest. It was first held in 1964.

History 
Like most music festivals in isolated countries, the Festival da Canção was a very important event for the still-incipient Portuguese music industry of the 1960s and 1970s. Left-wing composers and writers would try to squeeze subversive lyrics in the contest, with great effect. After the 1974 revolution, incidentally code-triggered by that year's winner being played on national radio, Portugal became increasingly open to foreign culture, thus deeming the Festival as a lesser musical event, dominated by below-standard pop songs with little or no impact in the industry, although remaining a popular TV show.

The 1990s saw a recovery of the contest's image, then considered a viable means for a new singer to start a career. Internationally acclaimed Portuguese singers Dulce Pontes and Sara Tavares made their debut in the 1991 and 1994 editions, respectively. Many other unknown performers like Lucia Moniz and Anabela leaped to national stardom after taking the RTP trophy.

After reaching an all-time high 6th place in the 1996 edition of the Eurovision Song Contest, the festival steadily declined from then on. In 2000, the winner Liana did not participate in the Eurovision Song Contest 2000, as Portugal had been relegated from the 2000 contest after two consecutive poor showings in 1998 and 1999; this would be the second time in the festival's history that the winner did not participate in Eurovision. In 2002, the Festival da Canção was placed on hiatus, contradicting the tradition of staging a Festival da Canção even without participating in that year's Eurovision Song Contest, as happened in 2000 and 1970. Since 2001, the festival saw consecutive changes of format. 2005 saw RTP commissioning a song for Eurovision, rather than organizing some kind of competition.

Since 2006, RTP settled for a traditional multi-singer, multi-composer competitive format, claiming the memory of older contests and songs. Producers have since been invited to come up with songs, lyrics and singers, and the 2007 result with Sabrina almost making it to the Eurovision final, gave RTP the necessary confidence to maintain the current format. In 2009, an open call for songs was held by RTP, abolishing the invited producers method, with online voting deciding the qualifiers to the televised final from a list of 24 songs, with 12 competing in the live contest.

More changes to the format of the contest were made in 2010. Two semi-finals and a final are now held to select the winner. Foreign composers were once again allowed to compete. Since 2017, different languages are allowed to compete.

The 2020 edition of the festival marked the third time in its history where the winner was unable to participate in Eurovision, as the contest itself was cancelled due to the COVID-19 pandemic.

Hosts 

1964: Henrique Mendes and Maria Helena Fialho Gouveia
1965: Henrique Mendes
1966: Henrique Mendes and Maria Fernanda
1967: Henrique Mendes and Isabel Wolmar
1968: Henrique Mendes and Maria Fernanda
1969: 
1970: Maria Fernanda and Carlos Cruz
1971: Henrique Mendes and 
1972:  and Carlos Cruz
1973: Alice Cruz and Artur Agostinho
1974:  and Artur Agostinho
1975: Maria Elisa and 
1976: Eládio Clímaco and Ana Zanatti
1977: Nicolau Breyner and Herman José
1978: Eládio Clímaco and Maria José Azevedo
1979: José Fialho Gouveia and 
1980: Eládio Clímaco and Ana Zanatti
1981: Eládio Clímaco and 
1982: Alice Cruz, José Fialho Gouveia,  and 
1983: Eládio Clímaco and Valentina Torres
1984:  and José Fialho Gouveia
1985: Eládio Clímaco,  and José Fialho Gouveia
1986: Eládio Clímaco, Ana Zanatti, José Fialho Gouveia, Henrique Mendes and Maria Helena
1987: Ana Zanatti
1988: Ana Paula Reis, Valentina Torres and António Sequeira
1989:  and António Vitorino de Almeida
1990: Ana do Carmo and Nicolau Breyner
1991: Júlio Isidro and Ana Paula Reis
1992: Eládio Clímaco and Ana Zanatti (final); Júlio Isidro (semi-final)
1994: Ana Paula Reis and Nicolau Breyner (final); Ana do Carmo and Luís de Matos (semi-final)
1995: Carlos Mendes, Sofia Morais and Herman José
1996: Isabel Angelino and Carlos Cruz
1998: Lúcia Moniz and 
1999: Manuel Luís Goucha and Alexandra Lencastre
2000:  and Gaspar Borges
2001: Sónia Araújo and Cristina Möhler
2002: Not held
2003: Catarina Furtado
2004: Catarina Furtado
2005: Eládio Clímaco and Tânia Ribas de Oliveira
2006:  and Jorge Gabriel
2007: Isabel Angelino and Jorge Gabriel
2008: Sílvia Alberto
2009: Sílvia Alberto
2010: Sílvia Alberto
2011: Sílvia Alberto
2012: Sílvia Alberto and 
2013: Not held
2014: José Carlos Malato and Sílvia Alberto
2015: Júlio Isidro and Catarina Furtado
2016: Not held
2017: José Carlos Malato and Sónia Araújo (1st semi-final); Jorge Gabriel and Tânia Ribas de Oliveira (2nd semi-final); Catarina Furtado, Sílvia Alberto and Filomena Cautela (final)
2020: Jorge Gabriel and Tânia Ribas de Oliveira (1st semi-final); José Carlos Malato and Sónia Araújo (2nd semi-final); Filomena Cautela and Vasco Palmeirim (final)
2021: Jorge Gabriel and Sónia Araújo (1st semi-final); José Carlos Malato and Tânia Ribas de Oliveira (2nd semi-final); Filomena Cautela and Vasco Palmeirim (final)
2022: Jorge Gabriel and Sónia Araújo (1st semi-final); José Carlos Malato and Tânia Ribas de Oliveira (2nd semi-final); Filomena Cautela and Vasco Palmeirim (final)
2023: José Carlos Malato and Tânia Ribas de Oliveira (1st semi-final); Jorge Gabriel and Sónia Araújo (2nd semi-final); Filomena Cautela and Vasco Palmeirim (final)

Green room presenters

Winners

Venues

Final

Venues (since 2017) 

Key: SF = Semi-final; F = Final

See also 

Portugal in the Eurovision Song Contest
List of historic rock festivals

References

External links 

 Festival da Canção Official Site

Eurovision Song Contest selection events
Music festivals in Portugal
Rádio e Televisão de Portugal original programming
Music festivals established in 1964
Pop music festivals
1964 establishments in Portugal
Annual events in Portugal